Hannah Cullum-Sanders (born 30 July 2003) is a field hockey player from Australia, who plays as a forward.

Personal life
Hannah Cullum-Sanders was born and raised in Maryborough, Queensland. Hannah graduated from Aldridge State High School, in 2021. Hannah plays for Redcliffe League.

Career

Domestic hockey
Cullum-Sanders has represented her home state, Queensland, at junior level on numerous occasions.

Hockeyroos
In 2022, Cullum-Sanders was named in the Australian Development Squad for the first time. In May of that year, she was named in the Hockeyroos squad for the 2022 Trans-Tasman Series in Auckland, where she made her international debut.

References

External links
 
 

2003 births
Living people
Australian female field hockey players
Female field hockey forwards
People from Maryborough, Queensland
21st-century Australian women